Solirubrobacter is a Gram-positive, spore-forming, aerobic, mesophilic and non-motile genus of bacteria from the family Solirubrobacteraceae.

References

Further reading 
 
 
 
 
 

 

Actinomycetota
Bacteria genera